Valentyn Arnoldovich Oletsky (born June 2, 1971), is a Ukrainian retired professional ice hockey player. He spent most of his career with Sokil Kyiv. He played internationally for the Ukrainian national team at several World Championships, as well as the 2002 Winter Olympics.

Career statistics

Regular season and playoffs

International

External links
 

1971 births
Living people
Elmira Jackals (UHL) players
EV Füssen players
HK Gomel players
Ice hockey players at the 2002 Winter Olympics
Idaho Steelheads (WCHL) players
Olympic ice hockey players of Ukraine
ShVSM Kyiv players
SKA Saint Petersburg players
Sokil Kyiv players
Soviet ice hockey right wingers
Sportspeople from Kyiv
Torpedo Nizhny Novgorod players
Ukrainian ice hockey right wingers
Ukrainian expatriate sportspeople in the United States